Tushen may refer to:

 Tushen, Ukhrul, a village in Manipur, India
 Tǔshén, or Tudishen, a Chinese deity

See also 
 Tuixent, a village in Catalonia, Spain
 John Tuschen, American poet